Orange Twin Records is an Athens, Georgia-based record label run by Laura Carter of the band Elf Power.

The label started in 1999 originally as a fundraiser for the Orange Twin Conservation Community and has released influential works by Jeff Mangum (Neutral Milk Hotel) and other bands from Athens, Georgia, including several Elephant 6 related groups.  Orange Twin has also re-released records by obscure folk artists Elyse and Sibylle Baier. The label is also a key sponsor for the Orange Twin Conservation Community, also located in Athens, Georgia.

See also
 List of record labels

References

Cooper, Kim "Neutral Milk Hotel's In the Aeroplane Over the Sea (33)", pg 12, 2005

External links
 Official site

American record labels
Record labels established in 1999
Folk record labels
1999 establishments in Georgia (U.S. state)